Haldun (also transliterated as Khaldoon or Khaldoun) is a masculine Arabic given name, it may refer to:

 Haldun Alagaş (born 1970), Turkish world and European champion karateka
 Khaldoun Baghdadi, Palestinian-American attorney
 Haldun Dormen (born 1928), Turkish actor
 Khaldoun Ibrahim, Iraqi footballer
 Khaldoon Al Mubarak, Emirati businessman
 Haldun Taner (1915-1986), Turkish playwright
 İbn-i Haldun (1332-1406), Tunisian historian and philosopher
 Khal Asfour, Australian politician and mayor

Arabic masculine given names
Turkish masculine given names